László Halmos (10 November 1909, in Nagyvárad – 26 January 1997, in Győr) was a Hungarian composer, choir director and violinist.

He wrote choral works, songs, chamber music, oratorios, cantatas, masses, as well as works for orchestra and for the organ, totalling several hundred works. He was choir director of Gyór Cathedral and also held the position of professor at the Theological College and the State Conservatory. As a violinist, he was one of the early members of The New Hungarian Quartet.

Works, editions and recordings
 Missa barbara
 Missa de Nativitate Domini
 Motets

References

Hungarian composers
Hungarian male composers
1909 births
1997 deaths
People from Oradea
20th-century composers
20th-century Hungarian male musicians